Kaike is a rural municipality located in Dolpa District of Karnali Province of Nepal.

The rural municipality is divided into total 7 wards and the headquarters of the rural municipality is situated at Sahartara.

Demographics
At the time of the 2011 Nepal census, 42.0% of the population in Kaike Rural Municipality spoke Magar, 37.1% Bote, 16.3% Nepali, 1.7% Gurung, 1.7% Sherpa and 1.2% Tamang as their first language.

In terms of ethnicity/caste, 79.6% were Magar, 11.6% Kami, 2.9% Tamang, 2.2% Chhetri, 1.8% Gurung, 0.9% Thakuri, 0.7% Hill Brahmin and 0.3% others.

In terms of religion, 83.1% were Buddhist and 16.9% Hindu.

References

External links
 Official website

Populated places in Dolpa District
Rural municipalities in Karnali Province
Rural municipalities of Nepal established in 2017